Passau is a Landkreis (district) in the southeast of Bavaria. It encloses the city of Passau geographically from two sides. Neighboring districts are (from the east clockwise) Rottal-Inn, Deggendorf, Freyung-Grafenau. To the south it borders Austria.

History
Archaeological findings prove that the area was settled more than 7000 years ago. In 1971 the district was created by merging the previous districts Wegscheid, Vilshofen, Griesbach (Rottal) and parts of the districts Pfarrkirchen and Eggenfelden. The city's original name was Batava (also known as Batavia) in Roman times. Passau survived three major fires, the biggest one being the all-destructive fire from 1662. After much of the city had burned down, bishops rebuilt it in Baroque style. To this day, massive cathedrals such as the St. Stephan's Dom (Dom means "cathedral" in German) stun visitors from all over the world. St. Stephan houses the world's largest church organ.

Geography
The district consists of two geographically different parts, separated by the river Danube. In the north is the southern part of the Bayrischer Wald (Bavarian Forest) mountains with hills up to 1000 meters tall. In the south of the Danube river the landscape is only hilly with plains between the valleys of the Inn and Ilz river.

Coat of arms
The bottom of the coat of arms show the blue-and-white checkered symbol of Bavaria. In the top part is a red wolf and a red panther. The wolf represents the abbey of Passau (Hochstift Passau), which is now the central part of the district. The panther is the symbol of the Wittelsbach family, and it represents the area of the former districts Vilshofen and Griesbach.

Towns and municipalities

Notes

References

External links

Official website (German)

 
Districts of Bavaria